Poiré as a surname may refer to:

 Alain Poiré (1917–2000), French film producer
 Alfonso L. Poiré (b. 1963), California attorney
 Emmanuel Poiré, or Caran d'Ache (1858–1909), French satirist
 Jean Poiret, born Jean Poiré (1926–1992), French actor and director
 Jean-Marie Poiré (b. 1945), French film director
 Poirot, a fictional Belgian detective, created by Agatha Christie

See also 
 Poiré, the French name for the alcoholic beverage Perry
 Poire Williams, a fruit brandy made from pears